MacAndrew is a Scottish surname. Irish forms of the name include Mac Aindréis and Mac Aindriú. The name was assumed by a branch of the Irish Barrett family. In Ireland, the surname is mainly found in the counties of Mayo and Donegal.

People
Charles MacAndrew, 1st Baron MacAndrew (1888–1979), Scottish politician
Hector MacAndrew (1903–1980), Scottish fiddler
Henry Macandrew (1866–1919), British Army general
James Macandrew (1819–1887), New Zealand ship-owner and politician
James Orr MacAndrew (1899–1979), Scottish politician
Jennie Macandrew (1866–1949), New Zealand pianist, organist, music teacher and conductor
Robert MacAndrew (1802–1873), British merchant and ship-owner, marine dredger, Fellow of the Royal Society, naturalist and collector of shells
Baron MacAndrew, of the Firth of Clyde, title in the Peerage of the United Kingdom

Places
Macandrew Bay, New Zealand

Things
MV Empire MacAndrew, British grain ship

See also
McAndrew

References

Surnames
Patronymic surnames
Surnames from given names
English-language surnames
Scottish surnames
Surnames of English origin
Surnames of Scottish origin
Surnames of British Isles origin